Bari Path is a road in Patna, the capital of Bihar. It was named after Professor Abdul Bari in 1948 after his murder in Khusrupur, Patna. Bari House was situated in this road. Mahatma Gandhi came to Bari House on 29 March 1947, the day after Bari's death. It connects Gandhi Chowk to Gandhi Maidan, runs parallel to Ashok Rajpath. It connects with Ashok Rajpath in many points, such as in Ramna Road, Khazanchi Road.

Landmarks 

 Noori Masjid
 Madarsa Islamia Shamsul Hoda
 Hakeem Saleh Dawa Khana
 Ramna Road
 Khazanchi Road
 Machuatoli
 Hathua Market
 P N Anglo Sanskrit School

References 

Roads in Bihar
Geography of Patna